Stuckenia striata is a species of aquatic plant known by the common names broadleaf pondweed Nevada pondweed and striped pondweed. It is native to the Americas, including the southwestern United States, northern Mexico, and parts of Central and South America. It grows in waterways such as rivers, canals, and shallow ponds, often in alkaline water. This is a perennial herb producing a long, thin, branching stem approaching  in maximum length. The inflorescence is a spike of flowers arranged in whorls and borne on a short peduncle.

References

External links
Jepson Manual Treatment
Flora of North America

Potamogetonaceae
Flora of North America